Hesperothamnus brachycalyx is a species of flowering plants in the family Fabaceae. It is a low shrub with the bark of the stem dark - gray and young branches finely velutinous. It is native to southwest Mexico.

References

Millettieae